Michael Anthony Madden (born January 13, 1958) is an American former professional baseball player who pitched in Major League Baseball (MLB) from 1983–1986 for the Houston Astros. Madden played college ball at University of Northern Colorado.

In 71 games and 26 starts, Madden compiled a 12–10 record, with 119 strikeouts and a 3.94 ERA.

References

External links
, or Retrosheet
Pura Pelota (Venezuelan Winter League)

1957 births
Living people
African-American baseball players
American expatriate baseball players in Canada
Baseball players from Denver
Burlington Bees players
El Paso Diablos players
Houston Astros players
Major League Baseball pitchers
Navegantes del Magallanes players
American expatriate baseball players in Venezuela
Northern Colorado Bears baseball players
Stockton Ports players
Tucson Toros players
Vancouver Canadians players
21st-century African-American people
20th-century African-American sportspeople